Potawatomi Point is an unincorporated community in Eel Township, Cass County, Indiana.

Geography

References

Unincorporated communities in Cass County, Indiana
Unincorporated communities in Indiana